Agrilus sinuatus, known generally as the sinuate peartree borer or hawthorn jewel beetle, is a species of metallic wood-boring beetle in the family Buprestidae. It is found in Europe and Northern Asia (excluding China) and North America.

Subspecies
These two subspecies belong to the species Agrilus sinuatus:
 Agrilus sinuatus sinuatus (Olivier, 1790)
 Agrilus sinuatus yokoyamai Iga, 1955

References

Further reading

External links

 

sinuatus
Articles created by Qbugbot
Beetles described in 1790